Kanyadan is a 1965 Indian Maithili-language film directed by Phani Majumdar. It was the first feature film in the Maithili language. This film was based on the novel Kanyadaan, written by Hari Mohan Jha.

See also
Cinema of Bihar

References

Maithili-language films
1965 films
Films directed by Phani Majumdar
Films based on Indian novels